Pathiriyal is a village located in the Malappuram district of Kerala, India. It reported a population of 24,725 in the 2001 census.

References

Villages in Malappuram district